The Women's Freestyle 63 kg competition of the Wrestling events at the 2015 Pan American Games in Toronto were held on July 17 at the Mississauga Sports Centre.

Schedule
All times are Eastern Daylight Time (UTC-4).

Results
F — Won by fall
R - Retired
WO - Won by Walkover

Final

Repechage

References

Wrestling at the 2015 Pan American Games
2015 in women's sport wrestling